Catherine Bush  (born 30 July 1958) is an English singer, songwriter, record producer and dancer.  In 1978, at the age of 19, she topped the UK Singles Chart for four weeks with her debut single "Wuthering Heights", becoming the first female artist to achieve a UK number one with a self-written song. Bush has since released 25 UK Top 40 singles, including the Top 10 hits "The Man with the Child in His Eyes", "Babooshka", "Running Up That Hill", "Don't Give Up" (a duet with Peter Gabriel), and "King of the Mountain". All ten of her studio albums reached the UK Top 10, with all but one reaching the top five, including the UK number one albums Never for Ever (1980), Hounds of Love (1985) and the greatest hits compilation The Whole Story (1986). She was the first British solo female artist to top the UK album charts and the first female artist to enter the album chart at number one.

Bush began writing songs at 11. She was signed to EMI Records after Pink Floyd guitarist David Gilmour helped produce a demo tape. Her debut album, The Kick Inside, was released in 1978. Bush slowly gained artistic independence in album production and has produced all her studio albums since The Dreaming (1982). She took a hiatus between her seventh and eighth albums, The Red Shoes (1993) and Aerial (2005). Bush drew attention again in 2014 with her concert residency Before the Dawn, her first shows since 1979's The Tour of Life. In 2022, "Running Up That Hill" received renewed attention after it appeared in the television series Stranger Things, becoming Bush's second UK number one and reaching the top of several other charts. It also reached number 3 on the US Billboard Hot 100, and its parent album, Hounds of Love, became Bush's first album to reach the top of a Billboard albums chart.

Bush's eclectic musical style, unconventional lyrics, performances and literary themes have influenced a diverse range of artists. She has received 13 Brit Awards nominations, winning for Best British Female Artist in 1987, and has been nominated for three Grammy Awards. In 2002, Bush was recognised with an Ivor Novello Award for Outstanding Contribution to British Music. She was appointed a Commander of the Order of the British Empire (CBE) in the 2013 New Year Honours for services to music. She also became a Fellow of The Ivors Academy in the UK in 2020. That year, Rolling Stone ranked Hounds of Love at number 68 on their list of the 500 Greatest Albums of All Time. In 2021, "Running Up That Hill" was also listed at number 60 in [[Rolling Stone's 500 Greatest Songs of All Time|Rolling Stone'''s 500 Greatest Songs of All Time]]. Bush has been nominated four times for induction into the Rock and Roll Hall of Fame: 2018, 2021, 2022, and 2023. She is listed on VH1's 1999 "100 Greatest Women of Rock and Roll" at number 46.

 Life and career 
1958–1974: Early life
Bush was born on 30 July 1958 in Bexleyheath, Kent, to an English doctor, general practitioner Robert Bush (1920–2008), and Hannah Patricia (née Daly) (1918–1992), an Irish staff nurse, daughter of a farmer in County Waterford. She grew up with her elder brothers, John and Paddy, in a 350-year-old former farmhouse at East Wickham near Welling, which neighbours Bexleyheath. Bush came from an artistic background: her mother was an amateur traditional Irish dancer, her father was an amateur pianist, Paddy worked as a musical instrument maker, and John was a poet and photographer. Both brothers were involved in the local folk music scene. She was raised as a Roman Catholic.

Bush trained at Goldsmiths College karate club where her brother John was a karate instructor. There she became known as "Ee-ee" because of her squeaky kiai.

Her family's musical influence inspired Bush to teach herself the piano at the age of 11. She also played the organ in a barn behind her parents' house and studied the violin. She soon began composing songs, eventually adding her own lyrics.

1975–1977: Career beginnings
Bush attended St Joseph's Convent Grammar School, a Catholic girls' school in nearby Abbey Wood. During this time, her family produced a demo tape with over 50 of her compositions, which was turned down by record labels. Pink Floyd guitarist David Gilmour received the demo from Ricky Hopper, a mutual friend of Gilmour and the Bush family. Impressed, Gilmour helped the 16-year-old Bush record a more professional demo tape. Bush recorded three tracks, paid for by Gilmour. The tape was produced by Gilmour's friend Andrew Powell; Powell later produced Bush's first two albums, and sound engineer Geoff Emerick, who had worked with the Beatles. The tape was sent to EMI executive Terry Slater who signed Bush.

The British record industry was reaching a point of stagnation. Progressive rock was very popular and visually oriented rock performers were growing in popularity, thus record labels looking for the next big thing were considering experimental acts. Bush was put on retainer for two years by Bob Mercer, managing director of EMI's group-repertoire division. According to Mercer, he felt Bush's material was good enough to release, but felt that if the album failed it would be demoralising and if it was successful Bush was too young to handle it. However in a 1987 interview, Gilmour disputed this version of events, blaming EMI for initially using the "wrong" producers.

EMI gave Bush a large advance, which she used to enroll in interpretive dance classes taught by Lindsay Kemp, a former teacher of David Bowie, and mime training with Adam Darius. For the first two years of her contract, Bush spent more time on schoolwork than recording. She left school after doing her mock A-Levels and having gained ten GCE O-Level qualifications.

Bush wrote and made demos of almost 200 songs, some of which circulated as bootlegs. From March to August 1977, she fronted the KT Bush Band at public houses in London. The band included Del Palmer (bass), Brian Bath (guitar), and Vic King (drums). She began recording her first album in August 1977.

1978–1979: The Kick Inside and Lionheart

For her debut album, The Kick Inside (1978), Bush was persuaded to use established session musicians instead of the KT Bush Band. She retained some of these even after she had brought her bandmates back on board. Her brother Paddy played the harmonica and mandolin. Stuart Elliott played some of the drums and became her main drummer on subsequent albums. The Kick Inside was released when Bush was 19, with some songs written when she was as young as 13. EMI originally wanted the more rock-oriented track "James and the Cold Gun" to be her debut single, but Bush, who already had a reputation for asserting herself in decisions about her work, insisted that it should be "Wuthering Heights". Two music videos with similar choreography were created by Bush to accompany the song. The studio version sees her perform in a dark room with mist while wearing a white dress, suggesting her character is a ghost (as is the case with Cathy in the novel that inspired the song). The outside version sees Bush dancing in a grassy area in Salisbury Plain (inspired by the novel's moors) while wearing a red dress.

In the United Kingdom alone, The Kick Inside sold over a million copies. "Wuthering Heights" topped the UK and Australian charts and became an international hit. Bush became the first British woman to reach number one on the UK charts with a self-written song. "The Man with the Child in His Eyes" made it onto the US Billboard Hot 100 where it reached number 85 in early 1979, and went on to win her an Ivor Novello Award in 1979 for Outstanding British Lyric. According to Guinness World Records, Bush was the first female artist in pop history to have written every track on a million-selling debut album.

Bob Mercer blamed Bush's lesser success in the United States on American radio formats, saying there were no outlets for Bush's visual presentation. EMI capitalised on Bush's appearance by promoting the album with a poster of her in a tight pink top which emphasised her breasts. In an interview with NME in 1982, Bush criticised the choice: "People weren't even generally aware that I wrote my own songs or played the piano. The media just promoted me as a female body. It's like I've had to prove that I'm an artist in a female body." In late 1978, EMI persuaded Bush to quickly record a follow-up album, Lionheart, to take advantage of the success of The Kick Inside. The album was produced by Andrew Powell, assisted by Bush. Although it gained a high number of sales and spawned the hit single "Wow", it did not reach the success of The Kick Inside, reaching number six in the UK album charts. She went on to express dissatisfaction with Lionheart, feeling that it had needed more time.

Bush set up her own publishing company, Kate Bush Music, and her own management company, Novercia, to maintain control of her work. Members of her family, along with Bush herself, composed the board of directors. Following the release of Lionheart, she was required by EMI to undertake heavy promotional work and an exhausting tour. The Tour of Life began in April 1979 and lasted six weeks. It was described by The Guardian as "an extraordinary, hydra-headed beast, combining music, dance, poetry, mime, burlesque, magic and theatre". The show was co-devised and performed on stage with magician Simon Drake. Bush was involved in every aspect of the production, choreography, set design, costume design and hiring. The shows were noted for her dancing, complex lighting and her 17 costume changes per show. Because of her need to dance as she sang, sound engineers used a wire coat hanger and a radio microphone to fashion a headset microphone; it was the first use by a rock performer since the Spotnicks used a rudimentary version in the early 1960s.

1980–1984: Never for Ever and The Dreaming
Released in September 1980, Never for Ever was Bush's second foray into production, co-producing with Jon Kelly. Her first experience as a producer was on her Live on Stage EP, released after her tour the previous year. The first two albums had resulted in a definitive sound evident in every track, with orchestral arrangements supporting the live band sound. The range of styles on Never for Ever is much more diverse, veering from the straightforward rocker "Violin" to the wistful waltz of hit single "Army Dreamers".Never for Ever was her first album to feature synthesisers and drum machines, in particular the Fairlight CMI. She was introduced to the technology while providing backing vocals on Peter Gabriel's eponymous third album in early 1980. It was her first record to reach the top position in the UK album charts, also making her the first female British artist to achieve that status, and the first female artist ever to enter the album chart at the top. The top-selling single from the album was "Babooshka", which reached No. 5 in the UK Singles Chart. In November 1980, she released the standalone Christmas single "December Will Be Magic Again", which reached No. 29 in the UK charts.

September 1982 saw the release of The Dreaming, the first album Bush produced by herself. With her new-found freedom, she experimented with production techniques, creating an album that features a diverse blend of musical styles and is known for its near-exhaustive use of the Fairlight CMI. The Dreaming received a mixed reception in the UK, and critics were baffled by the dense soundscapes Bush had created to become "less accessible". In a 1993 interview with Q magazine, Bush stated: "That was my 'She's gone mad' album." However, the album became her first to enter the US Billboard 200 chart, albeit only reaching No. 157. The album entered the UK album chart at No. 3, but is to date her lowest-selling album, garnering "only" a silver disc.

"Sat in Your Lap" was the first single from the album to be released. It preceded the album by over a year and peaked at No. 11 in the UK. The title track, featuring Rolf Harris and Percy Edwards, stalled at No. 48, while the third single, "There Goes a Tenner", stalled at No. 93, despite promotion from EMI and Bush. The track "Suspended in Gaffa" was released as a single in Europe, but not in the UK.

Continuing in her storytelling tradition, Bush looked far outside her own personal experience for sources of inspiration. She drew on old crime films for "There Goes a Tenner", a documentary about the Vietnam War for "Pull Out the Pin", and the plight of Indigenous Australians for "The Dreaming". "Houdini" is about the magician's death, and "Get Out of My House" was inspired by Stephen King's novel The Shining.

1985–1988: Hounds of Love and The Whole StoryHounds of Love was released in 1985. Because of the high cost of hiring studio space for her previous album, she built a private studio near her home, where she could work at her own pace. Hounds of Love topped the charts in the UK, knocking Madonna's Like a Virgin from the number-one position.

The album takes advantage of the vinyl and cassette formats with two very different sides. The first side, Hounds of Love, contains five "accessible" pop songs, including the four singles "Running Up That Hill", "Cloudbusting", "Hounds of Love", and "The Big Sky". "Running Up That Hill" reached No. 3 in the UK charts and re-introduced Bush to American listeners, climbing to No. 30 on the Billboard Hot 100 in November 1985. Bush has stated that she initially wanted to name the song "A Deal With God", but the record company was reluctant because some people might think it was "a sensitive title", but that "... for me, this is still called A Deal With God". The second side of the album, The Ninth Wave, takes its name from Tennyson's poem, "Idylls of the King", about the legendary King Arthur's reign, and is seven interconnecting songs joined in one continuous piece of music.

The album earned Bush nominations for Best Female Solo Artist, Best Album, Best Single, and Best Producer at the 1986 Brit Awards. In the same year, Bush and Peter Gabriel had a UK Top 10 hit with the duet "Don't Give Up" (Dolly Parton, Gabriel's original choice to sing the female vocal, turned his offer down), and EMI released her "greatest hits" album, The Whole Story. Bush provided a new lead vocal and refreshed backing track on "Wuthering Heights", and recorded a new single, "Experiment IV", for inclusion on the compilation. Dawn French and Hugh Laurie were among those featured in the video for Experiment IV. At the 1987 Brit Awards, Bush won the award for Best British Female Solo Artist.

1989–1993: The Sensual World and The Red Shoes
Released in 1989, The Sensual World was described by Bush herself as "her most honest, personal album". One of the tracks, "Heads We're Dancing", inspired by her own black humour, is about a woman who dances all night with a charming stranger only to discover in the morning that he is Adolf Hitler. The title track drew its inspiration from James Joyce's novel Ulysses. The Sensual World went on to become her biggest-selling album in the US, receiving an RIAA Gold certification four years after its release for 500,000 copies sold. In the United Kingdom album charts, it reached the number-two position. Another single from the album, "This Woman's Work", was featured in the John Hughes film She's Having a Baby, and a slightly remixed version appeared on Bush's album The Sensual World. The song reached number-eight in 2005 on the UK download chart after featuring in a British television advertisement for the charity NSPCC.

In 1990, the boxed set This Woman's Work was released; it included all of her albums with their original cover art, as well as two discs featuring the majority of her singles' B-sides recorded from 1978 to 1990. In 1991, Bush released a cover of Elton John's "Rocket Man", which reached number 12 in the UK singles chart, and reached number two in Australia. In 2007, it was voted the greatest cover ever by readers of The Observer newspaper. Another John cover, "Candle in the Wind", was the B-side. In the same year, she starred in the black comedy film Les Dogs, produced by The Comic Strip for BBC television. Bush plays the bride Angela at a wedding set in a post-apocalyptic Britain.

Bush's seventh studio album, The Red Shoes, was released in November 1993. The album gave Bush her highest chart position in the US, reaching number 28, although the only song from the album to make the US singles chart was "Rubberband Girl", which peaked at number 88 in January 1994. In the UK, the album reached number-two, and the singles "Rubberband Girl", "The Red Shoes", "Moments of Pleasure", and "And So Is Love" (featuring Eric Clapton on guitar) all reached the top 30. Bush directed and starred in the short film The Line, the Cross and the Curve, which featured music from her album The Red Shoes, itself inspired by the 1948 film of that name. It was released on VHS in the UK in 1994 and also received a small number of cinema screenings around the world.Mojo Magazine, page 81, October 2005 edition

The initial plan had been to tour with The Red Shoes release, but did not reach fruition. Thus, Bush deliberately produced her tracks live, with less studio production that had typified her last three albums and which would have been too difficult to re-create on stage. The result polarised her fan base, who had enjoyed the intricacy of her earlier compositions, with other fans claiming they had found new complexities in the lyrics and the emotions they expressed.

During this period of time, Bush suffered a series of bereavements, including the loss of guitarist Alan Murphy, who had started working with her on The Tour of Life in 1979, and her mother Hannah, to whom she was exceptionally close. The people she lost were honoured in the ballad "Moments of Pleasure." However, Bush's mother was still alive when "Moments of Pleasure" was written and recorded. Bush describes playing the song to her mother, who thought the line where she is quoted by Bush as saying, "Every old sock meets an old shoe", was hilarious and "couldn't stop laughing."

1994–2006: Motherhood, hiatus, and Aerial
After the release of The Red Shoes, Kate Bush dropped out of the public eye. She had originally intended to take one year off, but despite working on material, twelve years passed before her next album release. Her name occasionally cropped up in the media with rumours of a new album release. The press often viewed her as an eccentric recluse, sometimes drawing a comparison with Miss Havisham from Charles Dickens's Great Expectations. In 1998, Bush gave birth to Albert, known as "Bertie", fathered by guitarist Dan McIntosh, whom she met in 1992. In 2001, Bush was awarded a Q Award as Classic Songwriter. In 2002, she was awarded an Ivor Novello Award for Outstanding Contribution to Music, and performed "Comfortably Numb" at David Gilmour's concert at the Royal Festival Hall in London.

Kate Bush's eighth studio album, Aerial, was released on double CD and vinyl in November 2005. The album single "King of the Mountain", had its premiere on BBC Radio 2 two months prior. The single entered the UK Downloads Chart at number six, and would become Bush's third-highest-charting single ever in the UK, peaking at number four on the full chart. Aerial entered the UK albums chart at number three, and the US chart at number 48.Aerial, like Hounds of Love (1985), is divided into two sections, each with its own theme and mood. The first disc, subtitled A Sea of Honey, features a set of unrelated themed songs, including "King of the Mountain"; "Bertie", a Renaissance-style ode to her son; and "Joanni", based on the story of Joan of Arc. In the song "", Bush sings 117 digits of the number pi. The second disc, subtitled A Sky of Honey, features one continuous piece of music describing the experience of 24 hours passing by. Aerial earned Bush two nominations at the 2006 Brit Awards, for Best British Female Solo Artist and Best British Album.

2007–2013: Fish People: Director's Cut and 50 Words for Snow
In 2007, Bush was asked to write a song for The Golden Compass soundtrack which made reference to the lead character, Lyra Belacqua. The song, "Lyra", was used in the closing credits of the film, reached number 187 in the UK Singles Chart and was nominated for the International Press Academy's Satellite Award for original song in a motion picture. According to Del Palmer, Bush was asked to compose the song on short notice and the project was completed in 10 days.

In May 2011, Bush released the album Director's Cut, comprising 11 reworked tracks from The Sensual World and The Red Shoes, recorded using analogue rather than digital equipment. All the tracks have new lead vocals, drums, and instrumentation. Some were transposed to a lower key to accommodate her lowering voice. Three of the songs, including "This Woman's Work", have been completely rerecorded, with lyrics often changed in places. Bush described the album as a new project rather than a collection of remixes. It was the first album on her new label, Fish People, a division of EMI Records. In addition to Director's Cut in its single CD form, the album was released with a box-set that contains the albums The Sensual World and the analogue re-mastered The Red Shoes. It debuted at number two on the United Kingdom chart.

Bush's next studio album, 50 Words for Snow, was released on 21 November 2011. It features high-profile cameo appearance of Elton John on the duet "Snowed in at Wheeler Street". The album contains seven new songs "set against a backdrop of falling snow", with a total running time of 65 minutes. The album's songs are built around Bush's quietly jazzy piano and Steve Gadd's drums, and use both sung and spoken word vocals in what Classic Rock critic Stephen Dalton calls "a ... supple and experimental affair, with a contemporary chamber pop sound grounded in crisp piano, minimal percussion and light-touch electronics ... billowing jazz-rock soundscapes, interwoven with fragmentary narratives delivered in a range of voices from shrill to Laurie Anderson-style cooing". Bassist Danny Thompson appears on the album, while the sixth track on the album, "50 Words for Snow", features the voice of Stephen Fry reciting a list of surreal words to describe snow.50 Words for Snow received general acclaim from music critics. At Metacritic, which assigns a normalised rating out of 100 to reviews from mainstream critics, the album received an average score of 88, based on 26 reviews, which indicates "universal acclaim". At the 2012 Brit Awards she was nominated in the Best Female Artist category, and the album won the 2012 Best Album at the South Bank Arts Awards, and was also nominated for Best Album at the Ivor Novello Awards.

Bush turned down an invitation to perform at the 2012 Summer Olympics closing ceremony in London. Instead, a new vocal remix of her 1985 single "Running Up That Hill" was played. In 2013, Bush became the only female artist to have top five albums in the UK charts in five successive decades.

2014–2021: Before the Dawn and remastered catalogue

In March 2014, Bush announced her first live concerts in decades: Before the Dawn, a 22-night residency in London running from 26 August to 1 October 2014 at the Hammersmith Apollo. Tickets sold out in 15 minutes. The concerts received universal acclaim. An album of recordings from the concerts, Before the Dawn, was released on 25 November 2016. Bolstered by publicity around Before the Dawn, Bush became the first female performer to have eight albums in the UK Top 40 Albums Chart simultaneously, putting her at number three for simultaneous UK Top 40 albums. The only artists ahead of Bush were Elvis Presley, who had 12 entries in the top 40 after his death in 1977 and the Beatles who had 11 in 2009. She had 11 albums in the top 50.

On 6 December 2018, Bush published her first book, How to Be Invisible, a compilation of lyrics. In November 2018, Bush released two box sets of remasters of her studio albums. Vocals from Rolf Harris, who was convicted of multiple sexual assault charges in 2014, were replaced by versions by Bush's son Bertie. A compilation of rare tracks, cover versions and remixes from the boxsets, The Other Sides, was released on 8 March 2019. It includes the previously unreleased track "Humming," recorded in 1975. In September 2019, Bush released "" / "" on vinyl, in France, as a limited-edition promotional single.

In September 2020, Bush became a Fellow of The Ivors Academy, the UK's independent professional association for songwriters, composers and music authors. Following Bush's award, another Fellow, Annie Lennox, commented, "She is visionary and iconic and has made her own magical stamp upon the zeitgeist of the British cultural landscape."

2022-onwards: "Running Up That Hill" resurgence and The state51 Conspiracy
Bush's 1985 single "Running Up That Hill" gained newfound popularity in May 2022 after it was incorporated into the plot of the fourth season of the Netflix series Stranger Things. It became the most streamed song on Spotify in the United States, the United Kingdom, Ireland, Canada, Australia, New Zealand and globally. Winona Ryder, who plays the character Joyce Byers on Stranger Things, said she had pushed for the song to be on the show: "I've been obsessed with her since I was a little girl. I've also for the last seven years been dropping hints on set wearing my Kate Bush T-shirts." According to The Guardian, "Running Up That Hill" has become particularly popular with members of Generation Z, who were not born when the song was first released, and it has appeared in numerous videos on the social media platform TikTok. Bush released a statement praising Stranger Things and saying the resurgence was "really exciting".

On 10 June 2022, "Running Up That Hill" reached number two on the UK Singles Chart, surpassing its peak of number three from 1985. It was the most popular track of the week in the UK, ahead of "As It Was" by Harry Styles, but a pre-existing chart rule penalised older songs that are streamed. The Chart Supervisory Committee responded by giving the record an exemption from the "accelerated chart ratio" rule due to its ongoing sales resurgence. On 17 June, the song reached number one in the UK, making it Bush's second UK number one. It broke three UK chart records in the process. With 44 years since her last number one, "Wuthering Heights" in 1978, Bush surpassed Tom Jones's 42-year gap between number ones and replaced Cher as the oldest female solo chart-topping artist at 63 years and 11 months. Bush also achieved the record for a single with the longest period taken to reach number one, beating the previous record, held by "Last Christmas" by Wham!, by a year.

On the US Billboard Hot 100 issue dated 11 June 2022, "Running Up That Hill" re-entered the chart at number eight, surpassing its original peak of number 30 in November 1985 to become Bush's first US top-ten hit. A week later, it climbed to number four in the US, before reaching number three on 25 July. The parent album, Hounds of Love, also reached a new peak in the US, charting at number 12. The song topped the Australian ARIA Charts to become her second number one single in the country. In France, "Running Up That Hill" beat its original chart peak of 24, placing at number three. Hounds of Love also rose in popularity on various album charts, with it reaching number 1 on [[Jazz Albums|Billboards Top Alternative Albums chart]], making it Bush's first US chart-topping album in her career. On 10 June, The Whole Story rose from number 76 to number 19 on the UK Albums Chart, peaking a week later at number 17. A limited edition CD single was released in September 2022, in this format for the first time ever, through Rhino.

On 1 January 2023, Bush was included at number 60 in the list of 200 Best Singers of All Time by Rolling Stone.
On 22 February 2023, it was announced that her label Fish People moved to the new distribution partner of her catalogue, The state51 Conspiracy.

Artistry

Musical style and voice

Bush's musical aesthetic is eclectic, and is known to employ varied influences and meld disparate styles, often within a single song or over the course of an album. Her music has primarily been described as art pop, art rock, progressive pop, pop rock, avant-pop and experimental pop. Even in her earliest works, with piano the primary instrument, she wove together diverse influences, drawing on classical music, glam rock, and a wide range of ethnic and folk sources. This has continued throughout her career. By the time of Never for Ever, Bush had begun to make prominent use of the Fairlight CMI synthesiser, which allowed her to sample and manipulate sounds, expanding her sonic palette. She has been compared with other "'arty' 1970s and '80s British pop rock artists" such as Roxy Music and Peter Gabriel. Critic Simon Reynolds of The Guardian called Bush "the queen of art-pop".

Bush has a dramatic soprano vocal range. Her vocals contain elements of British, Anglo-Irish and most prominently (southern) English accents and, in its use of musical instruments from various periods and cultures, her music has differed from American pop norms. Reviewers have used the term "surreal" to describe her music. Her songs explore melodramatic emotional and musical surrealism that defies easy categorisation. It has been observed that even her more joyous pieces are often tinged with traces of melancholy and vice versa.

Songwriting and influences
Elements of Bush's lyrics employ historical or literary references, as embodied in her first single "Wuthering Heights", which is based on Emily Brontë's novel of the same name. She has described herself as a storyteller who embodies the character singing the song and has dismissed efforts by others to conceive of her work as autobiographical. Bush's lyrics have been known to touch on obscure or esoteric subject matter, and New Musical Express noted that Bush was not afraid to tackle sensitive and taboo subjects in her work. "The Kick Inside" is based on a traditional English folk song (The Ballad of Lucy Wan) about an incestuous pregnancy and a resulting suicide. "Kashka from Baghdad" is a song about a gay couple; She has referenced G. I. Gurdjieff in the song "Them Heavy People", while "Cloudbusting" was inspired by Peter Reich's autobiography, A Book of Dreams, about his relationship with his father, Wilhelm Reich. "Breathing" explores the results of nuclear fallout from the perspective of a fœtus.

Other non-musical sources of inspiration for Bush include horror films, which have influenced the gothic nature of her songs, such as "Hounds of Love", which samples the 1957 horror movie Night of the Demon. "The Infant Kiss" is a song about a haunted, unstable woman's infatuation with a young boy in her care (inspired by Jack Clayton's film The Innocents (1961), which had been based on Henry James's novella The Turn of the Screw). The title of the song "Hammer Horror" is from Hammer Film Productions' horror movies, and the song's story was inspired by the film Man of a Thousand Faces (1957). Her songs have occasionally combined comedy and horror to form dark humour, such as murder by poisoning in "Coffee Homeground", an alcoholic mother in "Ran Tan Waltz" and the upbeat "The Wedding List", a song inspired by François Truffaut's 1967 film of Cornell Woolrich's The Bride Wore Black about the murder of a groom and the bride's subsequent revenge against the killer. Bush has also cited comedy as a significant influence. She has cited Woody Allen, Monty Python, Fawlty Towers, and The Young Ones as particular favourites.

Technical innovations
Bush is regarded as the first artist to have had a headset with a wireless microphone built for use in music. For her Tour of Life in 1979 she had a compact microphone combined with a self-made construction of wire clothes hangers, so that she did not have to use a hand microphone and had her hands free and could dance her rehearsed choreography of expressionist dance on the concert stage and sing with a microphone at the same time. Later, her idea was adopted by other artists such as Janet Jackson, Madonna and Peter Gabriel.

Influence and legacy
Musicians who have stated their admiration for Bush's work include Cher, Elton John, Tori Amos, Annie Lennox, Björk, Ron Mael and Russell Mael of Sparks, Alanis Morissette, Elizabeth Fraser of Cocteau Twins, Sinead O'Connor, Dido, Anohni of Antony and the Johnsons, Big Boi of OutKast, Nigel Godrich, Damon Albarn, Stevie Nicks of Fleetwood Mac, Suzanne Vega, Joanna Newsom, Fever Ray, Beth Orton, Fiona Apple, Regina Spektor, Imogen Heap, Sharon Van Etten, Katie Melua, KT Tunstall, Ellie Goulding, Sarah McLachlan, k.d. lang, Erasure, Alison Goldfrapp of Goldfrapp, Tupac Shakur, St. Vincent, Darren Hayes, Florence Welch of Florence and the Machine, Lily Allen, Paula Cole, Charli XCX, Little Boots, Kate Nash, Bat for Lashes, Tegan and Sara, Steve Rothery of Marillion, Sky Ferreira, Rosalía, Beverley Craven, Tim Bowness of No-Man, Chris Braide, Anna Calvi, Kyros, Aisles, Neil Hannon of The Divine Comedy, Grimes, Solange Knowles, Julia Holter, Steven Wilson of Porcupine Tree, Robyn and Andre Matos. 

Coldplay took inspiration from "Running Up That Hill" to compose their single "Speed of Sound". In 2015, Adele stated that the release of her third studio album 25 was inspired by Bush's 2014 comeback to the stage. Nerina Pallot was inspired to become a songwriter after seeing Bush play "This Woman's Work" on Wogan.

According to an unauthorised biography, Courtney Love of Hole listened to Bush among other artists as a teenager. Tricky wrote an article about The Kick Inside, saying: "Her music has always sounded like dreamland to me.... I don't believe in God, but if I did, her music would be my bible". Suede front-man Brett Anderson stated about Hounds of Love: "I love the way it's a record of two halves, and the second half is a concept record about fear of drowning. It's an amazing record to listen to really late at night, unsettling and really jarring". John Lydon, better known as Johnny Rotten of the Sex Pistols, declared her work to be "beauty beyond belief". Rotten once wrote a song for her, titled "Bird in Hand" (about exploitation of parrots) that Bush rejected. Bush was one of the singers whom Prince thanked in the liner notes of 1991's Diamonds and Pearls. In December 1989, Robert Smith of the Cure chose "The Sensual World" as his favourite single of the year, The Sensual World as his favourite album of the year, and included "all of Kate Bush" in his list of "the best things about the eighties".

Marianne Faithfull mentioned Bush's four-octave range should be regarded as a "national treasure". "My favourite instrument in the whole world is the human female voice, and Kate Bush is one of the reasons why. It is, by far, a Stradivarius," Faithfull says. "Which is why she rarely deals with the press or isn't in a rush to record. She's one of the few who can be above all that." Kele Okereke of Bloc Party said about "Hounds of Love": "The first time I heard it I was sitting in a reclining sofa. As the beat started I was transported somewhere else. Her voice, the imagery, the huge drum sound: it seemed to capture everything for me. As a songwriter you're constantly chasing that feeling". Elton John cited Bush's duet with Gabriel, "Don't Give Up", for helping him to become sober, particularly Bush's lyric, "Rest your head. You worry too much. It's going to be all right. When times get rough you can fall back on us. Don't give up." He states, "she [Bush] played a big part in my rebirth." Rufus Wainwright named Bush one of his top ten gay icons. Outside music, Bush has been an inspiration to several fashion designers, including Hussein Chalayan. In 2020, Harry Potter author J. K. Rowling chose Bush's 1985 song "Cloudbusting" as the first of ten songs on Ken Bruce's BBC Radio 2 show Tracks Of My Years as it reminded her of her student years. In 1998 an asteroid was named after Bush.

In 2019, Pone, ex Fonky Family member, released Kate and me, an entire album created from samples of Kate Bush's work. According to The Guardian, it's the "first album in history to be entirely produced through an eye-tracking device". Pone declares that Bush is the greatest artist of the past 40 years. A few months later, after hearing about the album and listening to it, the English star wrote a message to the French producer, expressing her emotion, admiration and approval. With this encouragement, Pone reiterates the experience in June 2021 by publishing Listen And Donate. An EP composed of four tracks including two originals by Pone, still based on samples of Kate Bush's work, and two remixes produced by SCH and Para One. JR signs the visual part of the project. The goal is to raise funds for the Trakadom association, created by Pone and two doctors in collaboration with the intensive care unit of the hospital of Nîmes.

In 2020, Grazia magazine conducted an interview with UK Prime Minister Boris Johnson. When asked about the five most influential women in his life, Johnson placed Kate Bush at the fifth spot after deliberating between nominating Queen Elizabeth II, Margaret Thatcher, and Bush.

In addition to her music, her dancing has been critically acclaimed and proven influential, as well as enduring in the popular consciousness. Critics have noted her "pioneering synthesis of music and movement" and called her work "modern dance at its most powerful". Prix Benois de la Danse winner Sidi Larbi Cherkaoui credits her dancing as a formative influence. For the recurring The Most Wuthering Heights Day Ever event, thousands of people gather worldwide to recreate her dance routine from the "Wuthering Heights" music video—the outside version where Bush is seen dancing "out in the wily, windy moors", adorned with flowers and a flowy red dress.

Live performances

Bush's only tour, the Tour of Life, ran for six weeks in April and May 1979, covering Britain and mainland Europe. The BBC suggested that she may have quit touring due to a fear of flying, or because of the death of a lighting engineer, Bill Duffield, who was killed in an accident after a warmup concert. Mercer, who signed Bush to EMI, said touring was "just too hard ... I think [Bush] liked it but the equation didn't work ... I could see at the end of the show that she was completely wiped out." Bush described the tour as "enormously enjoyable" but "absolutely exhausting".

During the same period as the Tour of Life, Bush performed on television programs including Top of the Pops in the UK, Bio's Bahnhof in Germany, and Saturday Night Live in the United States (performing "The Man with the Child in His Eyes" with Paul Shaffer on piano, and later in the programme, "Them Heavy People"), which remains her only American television appearance. On 28 December 1979, BBC TV aired the Kate Bush Christmas Special. Bush participated in the first benefit concert in aid of The Prince's Trust in July 1982, at which she sang "The Wedding List" with a backing band composed of Pete Townshend, Phil Collins, Midge Ure, Mick Karn, Gary Brooker, Dave Formula and Peter Hope Evans. The performance was later released on VHS video, Laserdisc and CED disc. She performed live for British charity event Comic Relief in 1986, singing "Do Bears... ?", a humorous duet with Rowan Atkinson, and a rendition of "Breathing". In March 1987, Bush sang "Running Up That Hill" at The Secret Policeman's Third Ball accompanied by David Gilmour. She appeared with Gilmour again in 2002, singing the Pink Floyd song "Comfortably Numb" at the Royal Festival Hall in London.

Bush returned to headline performance with a 22-night residency, Before the Dawn, which ran from 26 August to 1 October 2014 at the London Hammersmith Apollo. The set list encompassed most of Hounds of Love featuring the entire Ninth Wave suite, most of Aerial, two songs from The Red Shoes, and one song from 50 Words for Snow.

Collaborations
Bush provided vocals on two of Peter Gabriel's albums, including the hits "Games Without Frontiers" and "Don't Give Up", as well as "No Self-Control". Gabriel appeared on Bush's 1979 television special, where they sang a duet of Roy Harper's "Another Day". She has sung on two Roy Harper tracks, "You", on his 1979 album, "The Unknown Soldier"; and "Once", the title track of his 1990 album. She has also sung on the title song of the 1986 Big Country album The Seer; the Midge Ure song "Sister and Brother" from his 1988 album Answers to Nothing; Go West's 1987 single "The King Is Dead"; and two songs with Prince – "Why Should I Love You?", from her 1993 album The Red Shoes, and "My Computer" from Prince's 1996 album Emancipation. In 1987, she sang a verse on the Beatles cover charity single "Let It Be" by Ferry Aid.

In 1990 Bush produced a song for another artist, Alan Stivell's "Kimiad" for his album Again; this is the only time she has done this to date. Stivell had appeared on The Sensual World. In 1991, Bush was invited to perform a cover of Elton John's 1972 song "Rocket Man" for the tribute album Two Rooms: Celebrating the Songs of Elton John & Bernie Taupin. In 2007 Bush's cover won The Observer readers' award for Greatest Cover of all time. In 2011, Elton John collaborated with Bush once again in "Snowed in at Wheeler Street" for her most recent album 50 Words for Snow. In 1994, Bush covered George Gershwin's "The Man I Love" for the tribute album The Glory of Gershwin. In 1996, Bush contributed a version of "Mná na hÉireann" (Irish for "Women of Ireland") for the Anglo-Irish folk-rock compilation project Common Ground: The Voices of Modern Irish Music. Bush had to sing the song in Irish, which she learned to do phonetically.

Artists who have contributed to Bush's own albums include Elton John, Eric Clapton, Jeff Beck, David Gilmour, Nigel Kennedy, Gary Brooker, Danny Thompson, and Prince. Bush provided backing vocals for a song that was recorded during the 1990s titled Wouldn't Change a Thing by Lionel Azulay, the drummer with the original band that was later to become the KT Bush Band. The song, which was engineered and produced by Del Palmer, was released on Azulay's album Out of the Ashes. Bush declined a request by Erasure to produce one of their albums because, according to Vince Clarke, "she didn't feel that that was her area".

Personal life

Bush is married to guitarist Danny McIntosh. They have a son, Albert McIntosh, known as Bertie, born in 1998. From the late 1970s to the early 1990s, Bush was in a relationship with the bassist and sound engineer Del Palmer.

Bush is a former resident of Eltham, southeast London. In the 1990s she moved to a canalside residence in Sulhamstead, Berkshire, and bought a second home in Devon in 2004. Bush is a vegetarian. Raised a Roman Catholic, she said in 1999:

The length of time between albums has led to rumours concerning Bush's health or appearance. In 2011, she told BBC Radio 4 that the amount of time between albums was stressful: "It's very frustrating the albums take as long as they do ... I wish there weren't such big gaps between them". In the same interview, she denied that she was a perfectionist, saying: "I think it's important that things are flawed ... That's what makes a piece of art interesting sometimes – the bit that's wrong or the mistake you've made that's led onto an idea you wouldn't have had otherwise." She reiterated her prioritisation of her family life.

Bush's son Bertie featured prominently in the 2014 concert Before the Dawn. Her nephew Raven Bush is a violinist in the English indie band Syd Arthur.

 Political views 
Some of Bush's songs contain references to political and social themes, such as "Breathing" which addresses the fear of nuclear warfare and "Army Dreamers" which examines the grief felt by mothers who lose children serving in the military during war. The tracks "Wow" and "Kashka from Baghdad" contain references to gay and LGBT themes. In a 1985 interview with The NewMusic, Bush stated "I've never felt I've written from a political point of view, it's always been an emotional point of view that just happens to perhaps be a political situation."

During the 1979 United Kingdom general election campaign, Bush, who at the time was on a live concert tour of the UK, posed for a photograph alongside the Labour Prime Minister James Callaghan. When asked about her political beliefs in a 1985 interview with Hot Press, Bush replied that she preferred not to discuss how she voted and added "I don't feel I am a political thinker at all. I don't really understand politics."

In The Comic Strip Presents... episode GLC: The Carnage Continues..., she produced and sang on the theme song "Ken". The song was a satirical take on how Hollywood glamourises and fictionalises political figures, in this particular case Ken Livingstone, the former leader of the Greater London Council, and the lyrics parodied the theme from Shaft.

In 2016, Canadian news magazine Maclean's published an interview in which Bush was asked about people being afraid of women holding political power. Bush pointed out that the UK, unlike the US, did have a female premier, Theresa May, who a few months earlier had become the Conservative Prime Minister. The interview quoted Bush as saying: "I actually really like her and think she's wonderful. I think it's the best thing that's happened to us in a long time ... It is great to have a woman in charge of the country. She's very sensible and I think that's a good thing at this point in time." In 2019, Bush published a clarifying statement on her website saying that she was not a Conservative Party supporter and did not endorse any political parties. She wrote: "Over the years, I have avoided making political comments in interviews. My response to the interviewer was not meant to be political but rather was in the defence of women in power."

In April 2021, Bush was one of 156 signatories of an open letter to Prime Minister Boris Johnson calling for a change in the wording of the Copyright, Designs and Patents Act 1988 to make royalty payments for streaming closer to the amounts paid for radio broadcast.

In December 2022, in her annual Christmas message, Bush voiced her support for the people of Ukraine following the 2022 Russian invasion of Ukraine, and expressed solidarity with nurses undertaking strike action, stating that NHS nurses should be "appreciated and cherished".

Awards and nominations

DiscographyStudio albums' The Kick Inside (1978)
 Lionheart (1978)
 Never for Ever (1980)
 The Dreaming (1982)
 Hounds of Love (1985)
 The Sensual World (1989)
 The Red Shoes (1993)
 Aerial (2005)
 Director's Cut (2011)
 50 Words for Snow'' (2011)

References

Further reading

External links

 
 
 
 
 Kate Bush interview, Ireland, 1978

 
1958 births
Living people
20th-century English women singers
20th-century English singers
21st-century English musicians
21st-century English women singers
21st-century English singers
Alternative rock keyboardists
Alternative rock pianists
Alternative rock singers
Art pop musicians
Art rock musicians
Avant-pop musicians
Brit Award winners
British alternative rock musicians
British female karateka
British women record producers
Columbia Records artists
Commanders of the Order of the British Empire
EMI Group artists
EMI Records artists
English Roman Catholics
English people of Irish descent
English record producers
English rock keyboardists
English rock pianists
English rock singers
English sopranos
English women guitarists
English women in electronic music
English women pop singers
English women singer-songwriters
Harvest Records artists
Ivor Novello Award winners
Musicians from Kent
People from Bexleyheath
Singers from London
Singers with a three-octave vocal range
Women rock singers
Anti- (record label) artists
20th-century women pianists
21st-century women pianists